RC Kredo-63 is a Ukrainian rugby club in Odessa. They currently play in the Ukraine Rugby Superliga, the top level of rugby union in Ukraine.

History
The club was founded in 1963.

Historical names
1963-1966  Avangard («Авангард»)
1967-1984  SC Yanvarets (СК «Январец»)
1985-1988  PO Pressmash (ПО «Прессмаш»)
1989-1991  SC Krayan (СК «Краян»)
1991-1993  RC Kredo-63 (РК «Кредо 63»)
1993-1995  Kredo-Yuzhrekon («Кредо-Южрекон»)
1996-2002  Kosmos-Myagkov («Космос-Мягков»)
2003-2004  Myagkov-Vitol («Мягков-Витол»)
2005-present  RC Kredo-63 (РК «Кредо 63»)

Players

Current squad

References

External links
 RC Kredo-63

Rugby clubs established in 1963
Ukrainian rugby union teams
Sport in Odesa